Pyrilia is a genus of parrots in the family Psittacidae. It was recently split from the now-monotypic Pionopsitta, and then briefly moved to Gypopsitta. But as Pyrilia was published a few months before Gypopsitta, the latter is a junior synonym.

All are relatively short-tailed parrots that are restricted to forests in the Neotropics. Their head or face contrasts clearly with the mainly green body, and they have a brownish or olive patch on the chest.

Species

References

 
Bird genera
Taxa named by Charles Lucien Bonaparte